Encyclopedia of Newfoundland and Labrador is an Encyclopedia commissioned by Joey Smallwood to capture the people, places, events and history of the Province of Newfoundland and Labrador. Smallwood's view on the purpose of the encyclopedia was summed up in his remark 
The work took nearly thirteen years to complete and contains 5 volumes containing over 3,900 pages by more than 200 authors. The first volume was printed in 1981 with volume two released in 1984. Smallwood had suffered a stroke two months after volume two was released. The work was suspended until 1987 when the Joseph R. Smallwood Foundation was established with a mandate to complete the five volume encyclopedia. Volume five was published in 1994. Marketing of the volumes is by The Institute of Social and Economic Research of Memorial University with proceeds going toward the J. R. Smallwood Centre for Newfoundland Studies.

External links
  Encyclopedia of Newfoundland and Labrador, Digital Archives Initiative, Centre for Newfoundland Studies of Memorial University of Newfoundland
 J.R. Smallwood Foundation for Newfoundland & Labrador Studies

Education in Newfoundland and Labrador
Mass media in Newfoundland and Labrador
Works about Newfoundland and Labrador
1981 establishments in Newfoundland and Labrador
Area studies encyclopedias
Encyclopedias of culture and ethnicity
English-language encyclopedias
Canadian encyclopedias